The Kerala Sahitya Akademi Award for Humour is an award given every year by the Kerala Sahitya Akademi (Kerala Literary Academy) to Malayalam writers for writing a book of humour of literary merit. It is one of the twelve categories of the Kerala Sahitya Akademi Award.

Awardees

Notes: No awards in this category in 1997 and 2007.

References

Awards established in 1992
Kerala Sahitya Akademi Awards
Malayalam literary awards
Comedy and humor literary awards
1992 establishments in Kerala